Apart from the immigrant community that makes up the vast majority of Serbs in Slovenia, there are a few villages in the southern region of White Carniola inhabited by descendants of Serbs (Uskoks) that fled from the Ottoman Empire in the 16th century, beginning in 1528 and permanent by 1593. These immigrants founded settlements in which descendants of Serbs live to these days: Bojanci, Marindol, Paunoviči, Adlešiči, Žuniči, Miliči and others. The majority of the community have kept the Serbian Orthodox faith and their distinctive culture, although they have been almost completely assimilated to their Slovene-speaking environment. Some of them became Uniate (Eastern Catholic) in the 17th and 18th century.

History
With the Ottoman conquest of Serbian territories, groups of Serbs fled to the north or west; of the western migrational groups, some settled in White Carniola and Žumberak. In September 1597, with the fall of Slatina, some 1,700 Uskoks with their wives and children settled in Carniola, bringing some 4,000 sheep with them. The following year, with the conquest of Cernik, some 500 Uskoks families settled in Carniola. At the end of the 17th century, with the stagnation of Ottoman power due to European pressure during internal crisis, and Austrian advance far into Macedonia, Serbs armed themselves and joined the fight against the Ottomans; the Austrian retreat prompted another massive exodus of Serbs from the Ottoman territories in ca. 1690 (see Great Serb Migrations).
 
White Carniola, being the southernmost region of Slovenia, by the Kupa river, is also the northwesternmost Serbian linguistical island, heard from often repeated phrases. In reality, the Serbian language is rarely heard in the last four villages in which descendants of Serb uskoks live, who continue to espouse a Serb identity: Bojanci, Marindol, Miliči and Paunoviči. In the other historical European–Ottoman frontier villages in the region, there are today Uniate (Eastern Catholic) and Catholicisated descendants of Serbs who only speak the Slovenian language.

The community had traditionally taken wives from other Serb communities, such as in nearby Gorski kotar (in Croatia).  The first mixed marriage was recorded in Bojanci and White Carniola in 1947, and since then, Bojanci Serbs "seek wives in the Slovenian milieu". Before World War II, the gravestones were written in Serbian Cyrillic, while today, they are written in Serbian Latin. The assimilation of the White Carniolan Serbs continued, with a Serbian primary school being closed in 1992. In 1967, there was an estimated 500–600 Serbs in White Carniola. The number of Serb households shrunk with 300% during the 1981–1991 period, with a total number of 121 households in 1991. According to Zdravko Vukčević from Bojanci and Orthodox priest Jelenko Stojanović from Moravice, Serb children from Miliči and Paunoviči began entering Slovenian schools in Adlešiči and Črnomelj.

In the area  of White Carniola  are mentioned Vlachs from Marindol in 1668.  "die Walachen zu Marienthall beclagen sich"

Culture

Language
The community is bilingual, and in their Serbian speech mix Ijekavian and Ekavian. In Marindol, Miliči and Paunoviči, the Serbian idiom is common, while in Bojanci only the oldest generation speak it. The middle generation speak Serbian and Slovenian equally, while the youngest generation do not speak Serbian, while passively knowing it – grandparents speak to their grandchildren in Serbian, while they answer in Slovenian.

Religion
Bojanci, Marindol, Miliči and Paunoviči are Orthodox villages, with the population espousing a Serb identity. The Serbian Orthodox Church gradually loses its integral function in the region; Orthodox churches exist in Bojanci and Miliči, while the parish of Miliči include Marindol and Paunoviči. The churches are for long without priests. Miliči had their priest until 1950, while today the priest comes from Moravice, while the priest in Bojanci comes from Gorimje in Lika (the priest came once a month up until some years ago, today only for the biggest religious holidays.

Serbian Orthodox clergy in White Carniola have traditionally taken monastic vows in the Gomirje Monastery, and still today serve in the villages of Bojanci and Marindol.

Folklore
In old folk poetry of White Carniola, Serbian hero Prince Marko is often mentioned, sung in "clean Shtokavian".

Monuments
Serbian Orthodox churches
Church of the Beheading of St. John the Baptist in Bojanci. It dates to the late 18th century, when it replaced its wooden predecessor.
Church of Peter and Paul, Miliči
Marindol Church

Greek Catholic Churches in Slovenia
 Greek Catholic Church of Sts. Cyril and Methodius in Metlika
 Greek Catholic Church  of St. Svetica in Drage

Anthropology
Based on surnames found in White Carniola, it may be concluded that their ancestors were Serbs and Croats.

In Bojanci, the Serbs trace their origin to the families of Vrlinići (Sv. Đurđe), Radojčići (Sv. Nikola) and Kordići (Sv. Lazar).

Surnames
Surnames have been recorded since 1551.

Mihaljević
Vignjević
Milić
Vukmanović
Dejanović
Dmitrović
Prijić
Radosalić
Stojić
Vojnica
Dragičević and Dragićević
Stipanović
Vidojević
Bunjevac
Mikunović
Selaković
Katić
Jakovac
Vukčević
Paunović
Kordić
Radojčić
Račić
Vrlinić
Radovitković
Mirosaljac and Mirosaljić
Žunić
Vidnjević

Notable people
Radko Polič, actor

References

Sources

External links

People from White Carniola
 
Serbian Orthodox Church in Slovenia